Nora Bayly Slawik (born November 23, 1962) is a Minnesota politician, previously serving as Chairwoman of the Metropolitan Council, Maplewood Mayor and Minnesota State Representative. From 1997 to 1998 and 2001–2012, she represented District 57A, and from 2003 to 2012, she represented District 55B, which includes portions of Ramsey and Washington counties and the cities of Maplewood and Oakdale in the eastern part of the Twin Cities metropolitan area. As Mayor of Maplewood, first elected in 2013 and re-elected in 2018, she oversaw economic redevelopment, increased public safety, and expansion of Maplewood's public outdoor spaces. In 2018, she was appointed by Governor Tim Walz to serve as head of the Metropolitan Council, where she worked until stepping down in November 2019. She also has a history of community service before her time in office, including her development of Juniper as their Project Manager for the Metropolitan Area Agency on Aging from 2016 to 2017.

Legislative service
Slawik was first elected in 1996 and served one term. She ran again in 2000, was elected for six more consecutive terms as a Democrat.  Prior to the 2002 legislative redistricting, she represented the old District 57A. She served on a variety of committees including as Chair of the Early Learning Finance Division for two terms, Health Care and Human Services Finance Division. State Government Finance Division and Ways and Means. She served as an assistant minority leader during the 2003-2004 biennium. In 2012, she announced that she was stepping down.

Maplewood Mayor
In 2013, Slawik announced that she would seek election as Mayor of Maplewood and won the DFL endorsement. In the primary, she received 60% of the vote, and faced former Mayor Diana Longrie in the November election.  Slawik won the Mayor election in November with 67 percent of the vote.   She serves as the Chair of the Rush Line Policy Advisory Committee; alternate on the Gateway Corridor Commission, and as Fourth Vice President of the Minnesota Mayors Association.

In 2018, Slawik was successfully re-elected to a second term for Mayor of Maplewood. She
faced opponent Margaret Behrens and won with 63% of the vote. Following her appointment to chair the Metropolitan Council, City Councilwoman Marylee Abrams was appointed to fill the soon-to-be-vacant Mayor seat.

Metropolitan Council
In December 2018, Governor Tim Walz announced that he would appoint Nora Slawik as Chairwoman of the Metropolitan Council to join his incoming cabinet. Nora was officially sworn in as chair on January 9, 2019. As chair of the council and Cabinet member she oversaw policymaking, planning, and services in the areas of water, transportation, parks, and housing for the Twin Cities metropolitan region. The council's work is performed by three primary organizational divisions: community development, environmental services, and the transportation division that includes Metro Transit and the Metropolitan Transportation Services. On October 31, 2019 she submitted her letter of resignation to Governor Walz citing health issues, stepping down on November 15.

Education
Slawik graduated from the University of Minnesota in Minneapolis, earning her M.P.A. from the Humphrey School, where she has since served as adjunct professor and mentor. and attended Arizona State University, where she received her B.S. in Recreation Administration.

Slawik currently works at the Century College Foundation as Executive Director in White Bear Lake, Minnesota.  She oversees development, alumni, private foundation grants and raising scholarship funds for the state funded college in partnership with college leadership and the board of directors.  Slawik continues to be active in the community as a member of the White Bear Lake Rotary, a member of the Stillwater Area Community Foundation and in various nonprofit organizations.

References

External links 

 Project Votesmart - Rep. Nora Slawik Profile
 Nora Slawik Campaign Web Site
 City of Maplewood website

1962 births
Living people
Arizona State University alumni
Humphrey School of Public Affairs alumni
People from Maplewood, Minnesota
Politicians from Tucson, Arizona
Democratic Party members of the Minnesota House of Representatives
Women mayors of places in Minnesota
Women state legislators in Minnesota
21st-century American politicians
21st-century American women politicians